RPM was a Canadian magazine that published the best-performing singles of Canada from 1964 to 2000. Twenty-five singles peak atop the RPM Singles Chart in 1988. "Faith" by George Michael held the top position from 1987 into 1988, and Chicago achieved the final number-one hit of the year with "Look Away". Eight musical acts peaked at number one in Canada for the first time this year: MARRS, Rick Astley, Terence Trent D'Arby, Midnight Oil, INXS, Cheap Trick, Tracy Chapman, and Bobby McFerrin. No Canadian acts topped the chart this year.

1988 was a successful year for British musical acts in Canada. Trinidadian-English singer Billy Ocean had the most successful single of the year with "Get Outta My Dreams, Get into My Car", which topped the chart for four weeks in April. However, it was George Michael who picked up the most number-one singles in 1988, topping the RPM Singles Chart with "Faith", "One More Try", "Monkey", and "Kissing a Fool". In total, Michael stayed at the summit for seven weeks. Meanwhile, a third English singer, Rick Astley, accumulated eight weeks at number one with three hits: "Never Gonna Give You Up", "Together Forever", and "It Would Take a Strong Strong Man", the most out of any artist during the year.

Along with "Get Outta My Dreams, Get into My Car" and "Together Forever", "Desire" by Irish band U2 was the joint-longest-running number-one track of 1988, staying at the top for four weeks in November and December. George Harrison, Tiffany, M|A|R|R|S, Elton John, and Phil Collins all stayed at number one for three weeks with their sole 1988 number ones. This year, only two female acts obtained a number-one hit: Tiffany and Tracy Chapman.

Chart history

Notes

See also
1988 in music

List of Billboard Hot 100 number ones of 1988

References

External links
 Read about RPM Magazine at the AV Trust
 Search RPM charts here at Library and Archives Canada

 
1988 record charts
1988